Dezső Bundzsák (3 May 1928 – 1 October 2010) was a Hungarian football player and coach. Bundzsák played as a striker or midfielder at both professional and international levels, before becoming a coach who worked throughout Europe and Africa.

Career

Playing career
Born in Kiskunhalas, Bundzsák began his professional career in 1950 with Vasas SC. Bundzsák spent 14 seasons with the club, scoring 73 goals in 249 games. He represented Vasas at the 1957–58 European Cup.

He also represented Hungary at international level, earning 25 caps between 1956 and 1961. He also played at the 1958 FIFA World Cup.

Coaching career
Bundzsák coached a number of club sides in Greece, such as Pierikos, Panionios, Apollon Athens, Panachaiki and Hungary, including former club Vasas SC. He also managed the Egypt national team in 1979.

Death
Bundzsák died on 1 October 2010, aged 82.

References

External links
 
 

1928 births
2010 deaths
Footballers from Budapest
Hungarian footballers
Association football forwards
Association football midfielders
Hungary international footballers
Vasas SC players
1958 FIFA World Cup players
Hungarian football managers
Nemzeti Bajnokság I managers
Panionios F.C. managers
Egypt national football team managers
Vasas SC managers
Panachaiki F.C. managers
Apollon Smyrnis F.C. managers
Hungarian expatriate football managers
Hungarian expatriate sportspeople in Egypt
Expatriate football managers in Egypt
Hungarian expatriate sportspeople in Greece
Expatriate football managers in Greece